Ali Raza (born 4 February 1977) is a Pakistani first-class cricketer who played for Lahore cricket team.

References

External links
 

1977 births
Living people
Pakistani cricketers
Bahawalpur cricketers
Lahore cricketers
Sui Northern Gas Pipelines Limited cricketers
Cricketers from Lahore